Yitzhak Nissim (1896 - August 9, 1981) was a Sephardic chief rabbi of Israel. Nissim was born in Baghdad and immigrated to Israel in 1925.
He studied under Rabbi Sadqa Hussein.

In 1955, he became Chief Sephardic Rabbi. As a gesture of goodwill, he visited some kibbutzim, which at that time were predominantly Ashkenazi and secular. He was also emphatic that the Bene Israel, who had been rejected as Jews by other rabbis, were Jewish.

In 1964, Pope Paul VI visited Israel but refused to visit the heads of other religions, insisting that they come visit him. In protest, Nissim boycotted this visit, insisting that he was willing to visit the Pope as long as there would be reciprocity if a chief rabbi came to Rome.

He was the father of Moshe Nissim and Meir Benayahu.

External links 
 Memorial website

References 

1896 births
1981 deaths
20th-century Israeli rabbis
Iraqi Jews
People from Baghdad
Iraqi emigrants to Israel
Rishon LeZion (rabbi)